If Society is an independent record label from Helsinki, Finland.

Roster
Black Audio
Echo Is Your Love
Fun
Frivolvol
Hero Dishonest
Ninetynine
Radiopuhelimet
Siniaalto
Valse Triste
Viola

Discography

Albums
Fun: Zu-pa! (2007)
Radiopuhelimet: Viisi tähteä (2007)
Valse Triste: Madon luku (2006)
Ninetynine: Worlds of Population, Worlds of Space, Worlds of Robots (2006)
Echo Is Your Love: Humansize (2006)
Black Audio: Iron Rhino (2006)
Viola: Anything Can Stop Us (2005)
Boys of Scandinavia: Kill the Party (2005)
Red Carpet: The Noise of Red Carpet (2005)
Frivolvol: Frivolous vol 2: The False Security Program (2005)
Hero Dishonest: Juggernaut + Let Your Poison Scream (2005)
Viola: Melancholydisco (2005)
Rytmihäiriö: Saatana on Herra (2005)
Echo Is Your Love: Paper Cut Eye (2004)
Fun: Szklarska Poreba LP (2004)
Hero Dishonest: Let Your Poison Scream (2004)
Siniaalto: Tallentumia (2004)
Viola: Tearcandy (2004)
Siniaalto: Siniaalto (2002)
Hero Dishonest: Juggernaut (2002)
Echo Is Your Love: 8 Hours (2002)
Hero Dishonest: Pleasure/ Disgust (2001)
Echo Is Your Love: Sheets of Blank Fucking Paper (2000)
V/A: Rantings Of A Free Thinker (2000)
Sissy Spacek: Telegram before departure (1999)

External links
 If Society website
 If Society at Last.fm

Finnish independent record labels
Record labels established in 1999
Indie rock record labels
1999 establishments in Finland